Burl Ives Presents America's Musical Heritage, released in 1963 by the Longines Symphonette Recording Society, is a six-album box set by folk singer Burl Ives. It is subtitled 114 Best Loved Songs & Ballads for Listening, Singing, and Reading and includes a 168-page book, titled The Burl Ives Sing-Along Song Book, which presents the lyrics for all of the songs and historical background about some of the songs.

Many of the songs can be found on Ives' six-album set Historical America in Song, released by Encyclopædia Britannica Films in 1950. The two sets are not identical, however. For example, while there is considerable overlapping between New Ballads and two of the albums in the 1950 set, there is almost no overlapping between Tales for Singing and the earlier set. The duplicated songs on the 1963 set seem to be fresh recordings. Certainly the sound is better on the six LPs that comprise the 1963 set than on the thirty 78 rpm records that make up the 1950 set.

Tales for Singing: Our English Inheritance (LW 194)

Track listing
Side 1

Side 2

New Ballads: Reporting the American Revolution & War of 1812 (LW 195)

Track listing
Side 1

Side 2

Traveling Songs: Sailing Free and Adventuring West (LW 196)

Track listing
Side 1

Side 2

Heart Songs: American Folk Creations (LW 197)

Track listing
Side 1

Side 2

Popular Songs: Music Hall and Battlefield 1800-1865 (LW 198)

Track listing
Side 1

Side 2

The Big Country: Cowboys, Indians, Badmen and Settlers (LW 199)

Track listing

Side 1

Side 2

References

1963 albums
Burl Ives albums